Huta Polańska  (Huta Polians’ka) is a village in the administrative district of Gmina Krempna, within Jasło County, Subcarpathian Voivodeship, in south-eastern Poland, close to the border with Slovakia.

References
Zych, K.S. (2003). Huta Polanska: Dzieje Osrodka Duszpasterskiego: 1904-2003. Rzeszow, Poland: Poligrafia Wyzszego Seminarium Duchownego. In Racino, J. A. (2014). Public Administration and Disability: Community Services Administration in the US. New York, NY, London, UK: CRC Press, Francis and Taylor Academic Press. Courtesy Joseph Bien, US Navy, Polish American War Veteran Family. Mother, Julia Centka Bien, from Huta Polanska.

Villages in Jasło County